Ploshcha Peremohy is a station on the Kyiv Light Rail. Originally opened in 1978, during the reconstruction of the tramways in 2010 the station was moved to the middle Zhilyanskry Street and the previous track loops were removed.

External links
 

Kyiv Light Rail stations